VLU may refer to:

 IATA airport code for Velikiye Luki Airport
 Văn Lang University, in Ho Chi Minh City, Viet Nam
 Väikeste Lõõtspillide Ühing an Estonian folk ensemble